Phthorimaea is a genus of moths in the family Gelechiidae. Species include the potato tuber moth, Phthorimaea operculella.

Species
 Phthorimaea euchthonia Meyrick, 1939
 Phthorimaea exacta Meyrick, 1917
 Phthorimaea ferella (Berg, 1875)
 Phthorimaea impudica Walsingham, 1911
 Phthorimaea interjuncta Meyrick, 1931
 Phthorimaea involuta Meyrick, 1917
 Phthorimaea molitor (Walsingham, 1896)
 Phthorimaea operculella (Zeller, 1873)
 Phthorimaea perfidiosa Meyrick, 1917
 Phthorimaea pherometopa Povolný, 1967
 Phthorimaea robusta Povolný, 1989
 Phthorimaea sphenophora (Walsingham, 1897)
 Phthorimaea suavella (Caradja, 1920)
 Phthorimaea urosema Meyrick, 1917

Status unknown
 Phthorimaea albicostella (Vorbrodt, 1928), described as Lita albicostella from Switzerland.
 Phthorimaea tobisella Palm, 1947 [nomen nudum]

References

 , 1989: Gnorimoschemini of southern South America IV: the genera Symmetrischema and Phthorimaea (Lepidoptera, Gelechiidae). Steenstrupia 15: 57-104.
 , 1990: Gnorimoschemini of Peru and Bolivia (Lepidoptera, Gelechiidae). Steenstrupia 16: 153-223.

 
Gnorimoschemini